Manny Martinez may refer to:

Manny Martínez (musician), drummer, formerly for The Misfits
Manny Martínez (baseball) (born 1970), former Major League Baseball outfielder

See also
Manuel Martinez (disambiguation)